Eddy Viator (born 2 June 1982) is a footballer who plays as a defender for Guadeloupe club Red Star Baie-Mahault.

Club career
Born in Colombes, France, Viator began his career with LB Châteauroux. After only one game in 2002–03, he went on to be regularly used in the following four 1/2 Ligue 2 seasons.

In January 2008, Viator moved to Spain and joined Granada 74 CF in Segunda División, being scarcely used during the campaign and also suffering team relegation. In the following summer, he returned to his country of adoption and signed for Amiens SC, also in the second level, and also being relegated in his first year.

On 20 July 2011, after one year out of professional football, Viator signed with Major League Soccer side Toronto FC, following a period of trial. That same night he made his competitive debut, in a 1–0 home defeat against FC Dallas.

Viator was waived by Toronto on 23 November 2011. In the following year, he signed a one-year contract with Felda United FC in the Malaysia Super League, after the teams in the competition were again allowed to register foreign players.

International career
In 2009, at the age of 27, Viator made his debut with Guadeloupe.

References

External links

1982 births
Living people
Sportspeople from Colombes
French people of Guadeloupean descent
French footballers
Guadeloupean footballers
Footballers from Hauts-de-Seine
Association football defenders
Guadeloupe international footballers
Ligue 2 players
LB Châteauroux players
Amiens SC players
Segunda División players
Granada 74 CF footballers
Major League Soccer players
Toronto FC players
Singapore Premier League players
Tampines Rovers FC players
2009 CONCACAF Gold Cup players
2011 CONCACAF Gold Cup players
French expatriate footballers
French expatriate sportspeople in Spain
Expatriate footballers in Spain
Guadeloupean expatriate footballers
Guadeloupean expatriate sportspeople in Canada
Expatriate soccer players in Canada
Guadeloupean expatriate sportspeople in Malaysia
Expatriate footballers in Malaysia
Guadeloupean expatriate sportspeople in Singapore
Expatriate footballers in Singapore